Meadowbrook is an unincorporated community in Harrison County, West Virginia, United States. Meadowbrook has a post office with ZIP code 26404.

References

Unincorporated communities in Harrison County, West Virginia
Unincorporated communities in West Virginia
Coal towns in West Virginia